Fort Mitchell is an unincorporated community in Russell County, Alabama, United States. The settlement developed around a garrisoned fort intended to provide defense for the area during the Creek War (1813–14).

Fort Mitchell is about 10 miles south of Phenix City, Alabama and Columbus, Georgia; Fort Benning lies on the opposite side of the Chattahoochee River from Fort Mitchell.

The community is the home of the Fort Mitchell National Cemetery, established in 1987 for interment of all US veterans.

Landmarks 
Fort Mitchell National Cemetery
Fort Mitchell Historic Site

History
A major United States fur trade factory was situated here between 1795 and 1807 before it was moved a few miles south to Hiawassee .

Notable people
James Cantey, Confederate States Army brigadier general
Samuel Checote, Muskogee Creek, who was the first principal chief of the tribe, then located in Indian Territory, after the Civil War
John Crowell, first U.S. Representative from Alabama; appointed by President Monroe as the United States agent to the Creek Indians (1821-?)
Antonio “Tone D.” Crawford  
Founder and CEO of Doomsday Music,
Community Activist, Recovering alcoholic

See also
Asbury Manual Labor School

Gallery
Below are photographs taken in Fort Mitchell as part of the Historic American Buildings Survey:

References

Unincorporated communities in Russell County, Alabama
Unincorporated communities in Alabama
Columbus metropolitan area, Georgia